Erythrobacter donghaensis  is a Gram-negative, non-spore-forming, slightly halophilic and motile bacteria from the genus Erythrobacter which has been isolated from the Sea of Japan in Korea.

References

External links
Type strain of Porphyrobacter donghaensis at BacDive -  the Bacterial Diversity Metadatabase	

Sphingomonadales
Bacteria described in 2004